Ba Football Club is a Fijian football club based in Ba that competes in the Fiji Premier League, the top flight of professional Fijian football. The club was founded in 1935. The club's home ground is the Govind Park. 

Ba Football Club have won more trophies than any other club in Fijian football, with a record 21 league and 8 cup titles.

History
Ba Football Club was formed in 1935 as a street football club by local Fijians. This was due to the efforts support from the Colonial Sugar Refining Company which owned a large Sugar Mill. In 1977, Ba Football Club became a professional club and became affiliated with the Fiji Football Association. In 1977, Ba participated in the 1977 Fiji National League which was the top tier of Fiji football. Ba were the winners of the first ever Fiji National League. In 1979, Ba won their second Fiji National League title and have since then won 21 league titles with their latest being in the 2018/19 season.

Current squad
					

	

Squad for the 2019 OFC Champions League

Youth squad

Former players

  Laniana Qereqeretabua

Honours
Fiji Premier League: 21
 1977, 1979, 1986, 1987, 1992, 1994, 1995, 1999, 2001, 2002, 2003, 2004, 2005, 2006, 2008, 2010, 2011, 2012, 2013, 2016, 2019.

Inter-District Championship : 24
 1961, 1963, 1966, 1967, 1968, 1970, 1975, 1976, 1977, 1978, 1979, 1980, 1982, 1986, 1991, 1996, 1997, 2000, 2003, 2004, 2006, 2007, 2013, 2015.

Battle of the Giants: 17
 1979, 1981, 1984, 1990, 1992, 1993, 1998, 1999, 2000, 2001, 2006, 2007, 2008, 2009, 2012, 2013, 2018.

Fiji Football Association Cup Tournament: 8
 1991, 1997 (shared by Labasa), 1998, 2004, 2005, 2006, 2007, 2010.

Champion versus Champion Series: 20
 1993, 1994, 1995, 1996, 1997, 1998, 1999, 2000, 2001, 2002, 2003, 2004, 2005, 2006, 2008, 2011, 2012, 2013, 2014, 2018.

Note: No football tournaments were held in 1987

Performance in OFC competitions
OFC Champions League: 8 appearances
Best: Finalist in 2007
1987: Third place
2005: Preliminary round
2007: Finalist
2008: 3° in Group B
2009: 3° in Group B
2012: 3° in Group A
2013: Semi Final
2014: Semi Final

See also
 Fiji Football Association

References

Bibliography
 M. Prasad, Sixty Years of Soccer in Fiji 1938–1998: The Official History of the Fiji Football Association, Fiji Football Association, Suva, 1998.

Football clubs in Fiji
1935 establishments in Fiji
Association football clubs established in 1935